Vardablur or Vartablur or Verdablur may refer to:
Vardablur, Aragatsotn, Armenia
Vardablur, Lori, Armenia